Philippe Achille Bédier  (1791 - 1865)  was Governor General for Inde française during the transition of Second Republic and Second French Colonial Empire under Second French Empire under Napoleon III.

Titles Held

References

French colonial governors and administrators
Governors of French India
People of the Second French Empire
People of the French Second Republic
1791 births
1865 deaths